Grand Saline Independent School District is an East Texas public school district based in Grand Saline, Texas (USA). The district encompasses roughly all of northeastern Van Zandt County and has a very small portion in extreme northwestern Smith County. The district operates 4 campuses in 5 buildings and also has various other buildings on former school district property. The district has a rating of "Standards Met", the highest rating given by the Texas Education Agency.

Administration
 Superintendent - Mr. Micah Lewis
 High School Principal - Mr. Ricky LaPrade
 Middle School Principal - Duane Petty
 Intermediate School Principal - Tina Core 
 Elementary School Principal - Laurie Hooten 
 Director of Athletics - Coach Michael Ridge
 Board of Education -
 Mr. Matthew Strickland, President
 Mr. Micah Lowe, Vice-President
 Mr. Eddie Stanley, Secretary
 Mr. Paul Moreno, Member
 Mr. Jeremiah Carnes Member
 Mr. Philip “Bear” Brown, Member
 Mr. Casey Jordan, Member

School District History
Grand Saline's first school was started in 1849 as Grand Saline School with a total pupil population of 378 students on Saline Creek, a Sabine River tributary. Around 1920, all of the local communities consolidated to form Grand Saline Independent School District and the first school opened around 1920 and moved into the city itself at the corner of High and Green Street. Shortly thereafter, the first brick gymnasium ever built in Van Zandt County was built on the same plot of land shared with the high school. In the 1940s, the population of the school began to expand due Grand Saline's economic development the school district built an elementary school for students in 1st through 6th grade on the opposite side of the city on Oleander Street and also built the district's first football stadium, Person's stadium, in honor of A.E. Persons, a wealthy citizen who was an oilman and contributed financially to the district and town. In 1962 Grand Saline's Board of Education and the citizens approved the construction of a new high school, new gymnasium and additions to Person's Stadium. The new high school was finished in 1965. The city of Grand Saline constructed Stadium Drive which was built for access to the new high school. A separate middle school building for grades 7–8 was built in 1980 next door to the high school, and across the street, a weight training facility, track and field set-up, and fieldhouse was built. Renovations would not come again until 1993, when district voters approved a bond issue that built a cafetorium, and added a student commons area in the high school which would connect the gymnasium and the classroom wings and create one building. Additionally, voters approved the construction of Indian Memorial Stadium, a new football stadium with an Olympic quality track and field and a seating capacity of 4,500 fans, replacing the old Person's Stadium, which became a practice field. In 1996, GSISD constructed a brand new Intermediate School to house grades 4, 5, and 6. In late 1999, due to a steady growth in the district, officials proposed the idea of building a brand new, 7 million dollar, state of the art high school next to the current facility. In the spring of 2000, voters approved the bond issue and construction began in summer of 2002 and was opened for classes in fall of 2004, with the capacity to house 550 students. In addition to much bigger classrooms, the new school houses a gymnasium with 3 basketball courts and seating for 1,200 fans, a new baseball field directly behind the new high school, and a new fine arts auditorium. In 2011, Grand Saline replaced their oldest campus, the elementary school. The new school was built directly on the former Person's stadium and directly across the street from the other 3 campuses. The same year, the district opened a softball complex, replacing the former softball field that was behind the old elementary school.

In March 2022 the district began permitting employees to have weapons if they are concealed.

District Schools and Facilities
The district currently operates 4 Schools in 5 buildings with a total district enrollment of roughly 1,200 students. 

In addition to the campuses, GSISD also owns and operates various facilities for athletic purposes and community purposes. The district still owns the original plot of land where the first in-city school was built. The land has the first school replica and the first gymnasium ever built by the district. Both are still used by the community. The old school was a project of the community group "Friends of the Old School." The group was dealt a terrible setback in 2009 when a fire almost destroyed the school, but was rebuilt due to generous donations by the community members.

Other facilities

Indian Memorial Stadium-Football stadium for the Middle School and High School football teams and Track and Field teams. Built in 1994, it seats 4,500 fans at capacity and is one of the top 3A and under grass stadiums in East Texas.

Shirely F. Anderson Tennis Complex-a tennis complex, built in honor of the former Grand Saline and Texas Christian University Football and Tennis standout and graduate. Currently under renovation

Indian Baseball Diamond-Constructed in 2003, the field is home to Grand Saline High School Baseball, one of the premier East Texas programs and also hosts the I-20 classic, along with nearby Van and Canton High Schools.

Lady Indian Softball Facility-Built in 2012, the facility is a venue for Grand Saline Lady Indian Softball.

The old Elementary school is still used as well for Head Start and other primary school age activities despite its age. The current Middle School (which was the old High School) is under renovation to correct issues with the aging of the building.

The Grand Saline High School Theater contains a full size proscenium stage, technical work room, tool room, costume storage, prop storage loft, and two dressing rooms. The multi-leveled cafeteria seating holds 500.

Recognition
As of the 2013 School year, Grand Saline ISD was awarded the highest possible rating by the Texas Education Agency's new ranking system, with a ranking report of "Met Standards" on the "core four" categories of Student Achievement, Student Progress, Closing Performance Gaps, and College or post-secondary Readiness. State target percentages for school districts in Texas to for "Met Standards" for the categories are, respectively, 50, 21, 55, and 75. GSISD surpassed them all with numbers of 77, 34, 75, and 83 percent, giving GSISD its best ranking since the 2005–06 school year.

Traditionally, Grand Saline has been between academically Recognized and Exemplary according to former TEA TAKS/TAAS standards. The district dipped to a low of Acceptable during the 2007–08 school year, but rebounded to be Recognized as in 2009–10.

Grand Saline High School and Grand Saline Middle School both were Exemplary Texas Schools from 1998 to 2004.

References

External links

School districts in Van Zandt County, Texas
School districts established in 1920
1920 establishments in Texas